Hofbräu is a German term meaning "royal brewer". It may refer to:

Breweries
 Cölner Hofbräu Früh, a brewery in Cologne
 Staatliches Hofbräuhaus in München (Hofbräu München), a brewery in Munich
 Hofbräu-Festzelt, the largest beer tent of the Oktoberfest in Munich
 Hofbräuhaus am Platzl
 Stuttgarter Hofbräu, a German brewery located in Stuttgart
 Würzburger Hofbräu, a brewery in Würzburg, Germany

Other
 Hofbrau, a style of carvery cuisine prevalent in Northern California